Henry Danforth Barron (April 10, 1833January 22, 1882) was an American lawyer, politician, and judge.  He was the 17th and 23rd speaker of the Wisconsin State Assembly, served six years as a Wisconsin circuit court judge, and was a member of the Wisconsin State Senate.  He also held several local offices and was a member of the University of Wisconsin Board of Regents.  He is the namesake of Barron County, Wisconsin.

Biography

Born in Wilton, New York, he graduated from law school at Ballston Spa, New York, and moved to Wisconsin in 1851. After arriving in Wisconsin, he became a publisher of the Waukesha Democrat and its successor, the Chronotype.  He was also appointed Postmaster of Waukesha by President Franklin Pierce.  He relocated to Pepin County in 1857 and began a law practice.  He was appointed Wisconsin circuit court judge by Governor Alexander Randall in 1860 and served until the election of a successor.

In 1862, he was elected to the Wisconsin State Assembly from the vast northwestern assembly district  comprising the lightly populated counties of Ashland, Burnett, Dallas (now Barron), Douglas, La Pointe (now Bayfield), and Polk.  He was re-elected in 1863, 1865, 1866, 1867, 1868, 1871, and 1872.

In 1869, he was offered appointment as chief justice for the Dakota Territory by President Ulysses S. Grant, but turned it down.  He was subsequently appointed fifth auditor of the United States Treasury, in April 1869, and served in that role until he returned to the Assembly in January 1872.

He was chosen as speaker for the 1866 and 1873 legislative sessions.  In 1873, he was elected to the Wisconsin Senate, and, was elected president pro tem of the Senate in 1875.  He was re-elected to his senate seat in 1875, but was then elected to the Wisconsin circuit court again in the Spring of 1876, defeating incumbent judge Solon Clough.  He remained on the court until his death in 1882.

In addition to his public offices, he was a Republican presidential elector in the 1868 and 1872 presidential elections, and was chosen president of the electoral college for both elections.  He was a Vice President of the Wisconsin Historical Society, and a member of the University of Wisconsin Board of Regents.

Barron lived in St. Croix County, Wisconsin. Barron County, Wisconsin, which he represented for many years as "Dallas County", was named after him by act of the legislature in 1869.

References

1833 births
1882 deaths
People from Wilton, New York
People from St. Croix County, Wisconsin
19th-century American politicians
Wisconsin state court judges
Democratic Party Wisconsin state senators
Speakers of the Wisconsin State Assembly
19th-century American judges
Democratic Party members of the Wisconsin State Assembly